Abirached is a surname. Notable people with the surname include:

Raya Abirached (born 1977), Lebanese television presenter and celebrity journalist
Robert Abirached (1930–2021), French writer and theatrologist
Zeina Abirached (born 1981), Lebanese illustrator, graphic novelist, and comic artist